Alice in Wonderland is a 1951 American animated musical fantasy comedy film produced by Walt Disney Productions and based on the Alice books by Lewis Carroll. The thirteenth release of Disney's animated features, the film premiered in London on July 26, 1951, and in New York City on July 28, 1951. It features the voices of Kathryn Beaumont as Alice, Sterling Holloway as the Cheshire Cat, Verna Felton as the Queen of Hearts, and Ed Wynn as the Mad Hatter. Walt Disney first tried to adapt Alice into a feature-length animated film in the 1930s and revived the idea in the 1940s. The film was originally intended to be a live-action/animated film, but Disney decided it would be a fully animated film.

Alice in Wonderland was considered a disappointment on its initial release, therefore was shown on television as one of the first episodes of Disneyland. Its 1974 re-release in theaters proved to be much more successful, leading to subsequent re-releases, merchandising and home video releases. Although the film received generally negative critical reviews on its initial release, it has been more positively reviewed over the years.

A CGI-animated reboot series, Alice's Wonderland Bakery, premiered on February 9, 2022.

Plot 

In a park in England, a young girl named Alice with her cat, Dinah, listens distractedly to her sister's history lesson, and begins daydreaming of a nonsensical world. She spots a passing White Rabbit in a waistcoat, who panics of being late. Alice follows him into a burrow and plummets down a deep rabbit hole. Upon landing in a place called Wonderland, she finds herself facing a tiny door, whose handle advises drinking from a bottle on a nearby table. She shrinks to an appropriate height, but has forgotten the key on the table. She then eats a cookie that causes her to grow excessively. Exasperated by these changes of state, she begins to cry and floods the room with her tears. She takes another sip from the bottle to shrink again, and rides the empty bottle through the keyhole. As Alice continues to follow the Rabbit after encountering a "Caucus Race", she encounters numerous characters, including Tweedledum and Tweedledee, who recount the tale of "The Walrus and the Carpenter". Alice tracks the Rabbit to his house; he mistakes her for his housemaid, "Mary Ann", and sends her inside to retrieve his gloves. While searching for the gloves, Alice finds and eats another cookie and grows giant, getting stuck in the house. Thinking her a monster, the Rabbit asks the Dodo to help expel her. When the Dodo decides to burn the house down, Alice escapes by eating a carrot from the Rabbit's garden, which causes her to shrink to 3 inches tall.

Continuing to follow the Rabbit, Alice meets a garden of talking flowers who initially welcome her with a song, but then banish her, believing that humans are a type of weed. Alice then encounters a Caterpillar smoking, who becomes enraged at Alice after she laments her small size (which is the same as the Caterpillar's), after which the Caterpillar turns into a butterfly and flies away. Before leaving, the Caterpillar advises Alice to eat a piece from different sides of a mushroom to alter her size. Following a period of trial and error, she returns to her original height and keeps the remaining pieces in her pocket. In the woods, Alice gets stuck between multiple paths and encounters the mischievous Cheshire Cat, who suggests questioning the Mad Hatter or the March Hare to learn the Rabbit's location, but is unhelpful in giving directions. Taking her own path, Alice encounters both, along with the Dormouse, in the midst of an "unbirthday" tea party celebration. The Hatter and the Hare ask Alice to explain her predicament, to which Alice tries, but becomes frustrated by their interruptions and absurd logic. As she prepares to leave, the Rabbit appears and the Hatter attempts to repair his pocket watch, which results in its destruction. Alice attempts to follow the Rabbit after he is ejected from the premises, but decides to go home instead. Unfortunately, her surroundings completely change, leaving her lost in the forest.

The Cheshire Cat reappears to the despondent Alice and offers a path to the hot-headed Queen of Hearts, the only one in Wonderland who can take her home. In the Queen's labyrinthine garden, Alice witnesses the Queen – whom the Rabbit serves as a chamberlain – sentencing a trio of playing cards to decapitation for painting mistakenly-planted white rosebushes red. The Queen invites a reluctant Alice to play against her in a croquet match, in which live flamingos, card guards, and hedgehogs are used as equipment. The equipment rig the game in favor of the Queen. The Cat appears again and plays a trick on the Queen, setting up Alice to be framed. Before the Queen can sentence her to decapitation, the King suggests a formal trial. At Alice's trial, the Cat invokes more chaos by having Alice point him out, causing one of the witnesses – the Dormouse – to panic. As the Queen sentences Alice to decapitation, Alice eats the mushroom pieces to grow large, momentarily intimidating the court. However, the mushroom's effect is short-lived, forcing Alice to flee through the deteriorating realm with a large crowd in pursuit. When Alice reaches the small door she encountered, she sees herself sleeping through the keyhole. Alice emerges from her dream, and she returns home for tea with her sister.

Voice cast 

 Kathryn Beaumont as Alice
 Ed Wynn as Mad Hatter
 Jerry Colonna as March Hare
 Richard Haydn as Caterpillar
 Sterling Holloway as Cheshire Cat
 Verna Felton as Queen of Hearts
 Pat O'Malley as Tweedledum and Tweedledee/Walrus and Carpenter/Mother Oyster
 Bill Thompson as White Rabbit/Dodo/Pat
 Heather Angel as Alice's sister
 Joseph Kearns as Doorknob
 Larry Grey as Bill the Lizard
 Queenie Leonard as Bird in the Tree/Snooty Iris
 Dink Trout as King of Hearts
 Doris Lloyd as Red Rose
 Jimmy MacDonald as Dormouse/Flamingo
 The Mellomen (Thurl Ravenscroft, Bill Lee, Max Smith and Bob Hamlin) as The Card Painters
 Don Barclay as The Card Soldiers
 Lucille Bliss as The Lazy Daisies/The Tulips
 Pinto Colvig as The Flamingos
 Jimmy and Tommy Luske as The Young Pansies
 Marni Nixon as The Singing Flowers
 Norma Zimmer as White Rose
 Erdman Penner as The Eagle
 Ken Beaumont as Card Painter

Directing animators 
Directing animators are:
 Marc Davis (Alice and the eyeglasses creature)
 Milt Kahl (The Dodo, Alice, Flamingo, Hedgehog, White Rabbit)
 Eric Larson (Alice, Dinah, Caterpillar, Cheshire Cat, Queen of Hearts, Flamingo)
 Frank Thomas (Doorknob, Queen of Hearts, Wonderland Creatures)
 Ollie Johnston (Alice, King of Hearts)
 Ward Kimball (Tweedledee and Tweedledum, The Walrus and The Carpenter, Oysters, Cheshire Cat, Mad Hatter, March Hare, Dormouse)
 John Lounsbery (Flowers, Caterpillar, Cheshire Cat, Mad Hatter, March Hare, Wonderland creatures)
 Wolfgang Reitherman (White Rabbit, The Carpenter, The Dodo, Mad Hatter, March Hare)
 Les Clark (Alice, Wonderland creatures)
 Norm Ferguson (The Walrus and The Carpenter)

Production

Development 

Walt Disney was familiar with Lewis Carroll's Alice books, Alice's Adventures in Wonderland (1865) and Through the Looking-Glass (1871), and had read them as a schoolboy.

In 1923, he was a 21-year-old aspiring filmmaker working at the Laugh-O-Gram Studio in Kansas City, making the unsuccessful short cartoon series by the name of Newman Laugh-O-Grams. The last of Newman Laugh-O-Grams was called Alice's Wonderland, which was loosely inspired by the Alice books. The short featured a live-action girl (Virginia Davis) interacting with an animated world. Faced with business problems, however, the Laugh-O-Gram Studio went bankrupt in July 1923, and the film was never released to the general public. However, Disney left for Hollywood and used the film to show to potential distributors. Margaret J. Winkler of Winkler Pictures agreed to distribute the Alice Comedies, and Disney partnered with his older brother Roy O. Disney and re-hired Kansas City co-workers including Ub Iwerks, Rudolph Ising, Friz Freleng, Carman Maxwell and Hugh Harman to form the Disney Brothers Studios, which was later re-branded Walt Disney Productions. The series began in 1924 before being retired in 1927.

In 1933, Disney considered making a feature-length animated-and-live-action version of Alice starring Mary Pickford. However, these plans were eventually scrapped in favor of Snow White and the Seven Dwarfs, mainly because Disney was put off by Paramount's 1933 live-action adaptation Alice in Wonderland. However, Disney did not completely abandon the idea of adapting Alice, and in 1936 he made the Mickey Mouse cartoon Thru the Mirror.

In 1938, after the enormous success of Snow White, Disney bought the film rights of Alice in Wonderland with Sir John Tenniel's illustrations, and officially registered the title with the Motion Picture Association of America. He then hired storyboard artist Al Perkins and art director David S. Hall to develop the story and concept art for the film. A story reel was completed in 1939, but Disney was not pleased; he felt that Hall's drawings resembled Tenniel's drawings too closely, making them too difficult to animate, and that the overall tone of Perkins' script was too grotesque and dark. Realizing the amount of work needed for Alice in Wonderland, and with the economic devastation of World War II and the production demands of Pinocchio, Fantasia, and Bambi, Disney shelved production on Alice in Wonderland shortly after the screening.

In fall 1945, shortly after the war ended, Disney revived Alice in Wonderland and hired British author Aldous Huxley to re-write the script. Huxley devised a story in which Lewis Carroll and Alice Liddell (the inspiration for Alice) were misunderstood and persecuted following the book's publication. In Huxley's story, stage actress Ellen Terry was sympathetic to both Carroll and Liddell, and Queen Victoria served as the deus ex machina, validating Carroll due to her appreciation for the book. Disney considered child actress Margaret O'Brien for the title role. However, he felt that Huxley's version was too literal an adaptation of Carroll's book. Background artist Mary Blair submitted some concept drawings for Alice in Wonderland. Blair's paintings moved away from Tenniel's detailed illustrations by taking a modernist stance, using bold and unreal colors. Walt liked Blair's designs, and the script was re-written to focus on comedy, music, and the whimsical side of Carroll's books.

Around this time, Disney considered making a live-action-and-animated version of Alice in Wonderland (similar to his short Alice Comedies) that would star Ginger Rogers and would utilize the recently developed sodium vapor process. Lisa Davis (who later voiced Anita Radcliffe in One Hundred and One Dalmatians) and Luana Patten were also considered for the role of Alice. However, Disney soon realized that he could only do justice to the book by making an all-animated feature and, in 1946, work began on Alice in Wonderland. With the film tentatively scheduled for release in 1950, animation crews on Alice in Wonderland and Cinderella effectively competed against each other to see which film would finish first. By early 1948, Cinderella had progressed further than Alice in Wonderland.

A legal dispute with Dallas Bower's 1949 film version was also under way. Disney sued to prevent release of the British version in the U.S., and the case was extensively covered in Time magazine. The company that released the British version accused Disney of trying to exploit their film by releasing its version at virtually the same time.

Writing 
Through various drafts of the script, many sequences that were present in Carroll's book drifted in and out of the story. However, Disney insisted that the scenes themselves keep close to those in the novel since most of its humor is in the writing.

One omitted scene from the 1939 treatment of the film occurred outside the Duchess' manor, where the Fish Footman is giving a message to the Frog Footman to take to the Duchess, saying that she is invited to play croquet with the Queen of Hearts. Alice overhears this and sneaks into the kitchen of the manor, where she finds the Duchess' Cook maniacally cooking and the Duchess nursing her baby. The cook is spraying pepper all over the room, causing the Duchess and Alice to sneeze and the baby to cry. After a quick conversation between Alice and the Duchess, the hot-tempered Cook starts throwing pots and pans at the noisy baby. Alice rescues the baby, but as she leaves the house the baby turns into a pig and runs away. The scene was scrapped for pacing reasons.

Another scene that was deleted from a later draft occurred in Tulgey Wood, where Alice encountered what appeared to be a sinister-looking Jabberwocky hiding in the dark, before revealing himself as a comical-looking dragon-like beast with bells and factory whistles on his head. A song, "Beware the Jabberwock", was also written. However, the scene was scrapped in favor of The Walrus and the Carpenter poem. Out of a desire to keep the Jabberwocky poem in the film, it was made to replace an original song for the Cheshire Cat, "I'm Odd".

Another deleted scene in Tulgey Wood shows Alice consulting with The White Knight, who was meant to be somewhat a caricature of Walt Disney. Although Disney liked the scene, he felt it was better if Alice learned her lesson by herself, hence the song "Very Good Advice".

Other characters, such as Mock Turtle and the Gryphon were discarded for pacing reasons, though they would later appear alongside Alice in some commercials.

Music 
In an effort to retain some of Carroll's imaginative poems, Disney commissioned top songwriters to compose songs built around them for use in the film. Over 30 potential songs were written, and many of them were included in the film—some for only a few seconds—the greatest number of songs of any Disney film. In 1939, Frank Churchill was assigned to compose songs, and they were accompanied by a story reel featuring artwork from David S. Hall. Although none of his songs were used in the finished film, the melody for "Lobster Quadrille" was used for the song "Never Smile at a Crocodile" in Peter Pan. When work on Alice resumed in 1946, Tin Pan Alley songwriters Mack David, Al Hoffman and Jerry Livingston began composing songs for it after working on Cinderella. However, the only song by the trio that made it into the film was "The Unbirthday Song".

While he was composing songs in New York, Sammy Fain had heard that the Disney studios wanted him to compose songs for Alice in Wonderland. He also suggested lyricist Bob Hilliard as his collaborator. The two wrote two unused songs for the film, "Beyond the Laughing Sky" and "I'm Odd". The music for the former song was kept but the lyrics were changed, and it later became the title song for Peter Pan, "The Second Star to the Right". By April 1950, Fain and Hilliard had finished composing songs for the film.

The title song, composed by Sammy Fain, has become a jazz standard, adapted by jazz pianist Dave Brubeck in 1952 and included on his 1957 Columbia album Dave Digs Disney.
The song, "In a World of My Own," is included on the orange disc of Classic Disney: 60 Years of Musical Magic.

Soundtrack and Camarata version 
There was no soundtrack album available when the film was released in 1951. RCA Victor released a story album and single records with Kathryn Beaumont and several cast members that re-created the story, but it was not the soundtrack. in 1944, Decca Records had released a Ginger Rogers dramatization of Lewis Carroll's book with Disney cover art (perhaps tying in with earlier discussions of her being cast as a live-action Disney "Alice"), Decca did indeed license the rights to release the 1951 Alice soundtrack from Disney, but later decided against it and never produced one. When Disney started its own record company, Disneyland Records, in Spring 1956, it was found to be economically unfeasible at the time to take on the fees and other costs to produce a soundtrack album.

In 1957, Tutti Camarata arranged and conducted an elaborate original production of the Alice score with Darlene Gillespie, who had shown great promise among the Mickey Mouse Club cast as a singer. Camarata assembled a new orchestra and chorus (possibly with the cooperation of Norman Luboff, as Betty Mulliner (Luboff) and choir member Thurl Ravenscroft can be heard) in the Capitol studios in Hollywood. The resulting album became one of the most influential and acclaimed studio versions of a score, garnering praise from within the industry as well as the public. The original issue (WDL-4025) depicting Alice seated in a tree with characters beneath her is highly collectible but the album was so popular it was reissued in 1959, 1963 and 1968 with different covers, as well as story albums with books and single records, all featuring music from this album, as well in translated versions of the Camarata Alice music for international recordings.

To date, the only soundtrack material ever made available on vinyl records was released outside the United States. In the late nineties, over 45 years after the film's original release, a soundtrack album of Alice in Wonderland was finally released in the U.S. on Audio CD by Walt Disney Records.

Songs
Original songs performed in the film include:

Songs written for the film but deleted during production include:

 "Beyond the Laughing Sky" – Alice (replaced by "In a World of My Own"; this melody was later used for "The Second Star to the Right" in Peter Pan)
 "Dream Caravan" – Caterpillar (replaced by "A-E-I-O-U")
 "Everything Has a Useness" – Caterpillar
 "I'm Odd" – Cheshire Cat (replaced by "'Twas Brillig")
 "So They Say" – Alice
 "When the Wind is in the East" - Mad Hatter
 "Gavotte of the Cards" - Alice
 "Entrance of the Executioner" - King of Hearts and Queen of Hearts
 "Beware the Jabberwock" – Stan Freberg, Daws Butler and the Rhythmaires (referring to the deleted character)
 "If You'll Believe in Me" – The Lion and The Unicorn (deleted characters)
 "Beautiful Soup" – The Mock Turtle and The Gryphon (deleted characters) set to the tune of The Blue Danube
 "The Lobster Quadrille (Will You Join the Dance?)" - The Mock Turtle (deleted character) 
 "Speak Roughly to Your Little Boy" – The Duchess (deleted character)
 "Humpty Dumpty" – Humpty Dumpty (deleted character)

Release 
Alice in Wonderland premiered at the Leicester Square Theatre in London on July 26, 1951. During the film's initial theatrical run, the film was released as a double feature with the True-Life Adventures documentary short, Nature's Half Acre. Following the film's initial lukewarm reception, it was never re-released theatrically in Disney's lifetime, instead being shown occasionally on television. Alice in Wonderland aired as the second episode of the Walt Disney's Disneyland television series on ABC on November 3, 1954, in a severely edited version cut down to less than an hour.

Beginning in 1971, the film was screened in several sold-out venues at college campuses, becoming the most rented film in some cities. Then, in 1974, Disney gave Alice in Wonderland its first theatrical re-release. The company even promoted it as a film in tune with the "psychedelic times", using radio commercials featuring the song "White Rabbit" performed by Jefferson Airplane. This release was so successful that it warranted a subsequent re-release in 1981. Its first UK re-release was on July 26, 1979.

Marketing 
Disney sought to use the new medium of television to help advertise Alice in Wonderland. In March 1950, he spoke to his brother Roy about launching a television program featuring the studio's animated shorts. Roy agreed, and later that summer they spoke to the Coca-Cola Company about sponsoring an hour-long Christmas broadcast featuring Disney hosting several cartoons and a scene from the upcoming film. The program became One Hour in Wonderland, which was aired on NBC on Christmas Day 1950. At the same time, a ten-minute featurette about the making of the film, Operation: Wonderland, was produced and screened in theaters and on television stations. Additionally, Disney, Kathryn Beaumont, and Sterling Holloway appeared on The Fred Waring Show on March 18, 1951, to promote the film.

Home media 
Alice in Wonderland was one of the first titles available for the rental market on VHS and Beta and for retail sale on RCA's short-lived CED Videodisc format. The film was released on October 15, 1981, on VHS, CED Videodisc, and Betamax for its 30th anniversary. Five years later, it was re-issued in the "Wonderland Sale" promotion on May 28, 1986 on VHS, Betamax, and LaserDisc for its 35th anniversary, and then it was re-promoted on July 12, 1991 for its 40th anniversary, surrounding the video re-issue of Robin Hood.

In January 2000, Walt Disney Home Video launched the Gold Classic Collection, and then Alice in Wonderland was re-issued on VHS and DVD in the line on July 4, 2000. The DVD contained the Operation: Wonderland featurette, several sing-a-long videos, a storybook, a trivia game, and its theatrical trailer.

A fully restored two-disc "Masterpiece Edition" was released on January 27, 2004, including the full hour-long episode of the Disney television show with Kathryn Beaumont, Edgar Bergen, Charlie McCarthy and Mortimer Snerd, Bobby Driscoll and others that promoted the film, computer games, deleted scenes, songs and related materials, and went into moratorium in January 2009. A year and two months later, Disney released a 2-disc special "Un-Anniversary" edition DVD on March 30, 2010 to promote the recent Tim Burton version. The film was released in a Blu-ray and DVD set on February 1, 2011, to celebrate its 60th anniversary, featuring a new HD restoration of the movie and many bonus features. Disney re-released the film on Blu-ray and DVD on April 26, 2016, to celebrate the film's 65th anniversary.

The film was released on Disney+ on November 12, 2019.

Reception

Box office 
During its initial theatrical run, the film grossed $2.4 million in domestic rentals. Because of the film's production budget of $3 million, the studio wrote off a million-dollar loss. During its theatrical re-release in 1974, the film grossed $3.5 million in domestic rentals.

Critical reaction 
Despite being regarded as one of Disney's best animated films today, and gaining a large following, the initial reviews for Alice in Wonderland were negative. Bosley Crowther, reviewing for The New York Times, complimented that "...if you are not too particular about the images of Carroll and Tenniel, if you are high on Disney whimsey and if you'll take a somewhat slow, uneven pace, you should find this picture entertaining. Especially should it be for the kids, who are not so demanding of fidelity as are their moms and dads. A few of the episodes are dandy, such as the mad tea party and the caucus race; the music is tuneful and sugary and the color is excellent." Variety wrote that the film "has an earnest charm and a chimerical beauty that best shows off the Carroll fantasy. However, it has not been able to add any real heart or warmth, ingredients missing from the two tomes and which have always been an integral part of the previous Disney feature cartoons."

Mae Tinee of the Chicago Tribune wrote that "While the Disney figures do resemble John Tenniel's famous sketches, they abound in energy but are utterly lacking in enchantment, and seem more closely related to Pluto, the clumsy pup, than the products of Carroll's imagination. Youngsters probably will find it a likable cartoon, full of lively characters, with Alice's dream bedecked with just a touch of nightmare—those who cherish the old story as I have probably will be distinctly disappointed." Time stated that "Judged simply as the latest in the long, popular line of Disney cartoons, Alice lacks a developed story line, which the studio's continuity experts, for all their freedom with scissors and paste, have been unable to put together out of the episodic books. Much of it is familiar stuff; Carroll's garden of live flowers prompts Disney to revive the style of his Silly Symphonies. Yet there is plenty to delight youngsters, and there are flashes of cartooning ingenuity that should appeal to grownups."

Alice in Wonderland was met with great criticism from Carroll fans, as well as from British film and literary critics, who accused Disney of "Americanizing" a great work of English literature. Walt Disney was not surprised by the critical reception to Alice in Wonderland as his version of Alice was intended for large family audiences, not literary critics. Additionally, the film was met with a lukewarm response at the box office. Additionally, he remarked that the film failed because it lacked heart. In The Disney Films, Leonard Maltin says that animator Ward Kimball felt the film failed because "it suffered from too many cooks—directors. Here was a case of five directors each trying to top the other guy and make his sequence the biggest and craziest in the show. This had a self-canceling effect on the final product."

On the film aggregator website Rotten Tomatoes, Alice in Wonderland received an approval rating of 84% from 31 critical reviews with an average rating of 6.80/10. The consensus states, "A good introduction to Lewis Carroll's classic, Alice in Wonderland boasts some of the Disney canon's most surreal and twisted images."

Accolades

Legacy

Stage version 
Alice in Wonderland has been condensed into a one-act stage version entitled, Alice in Wonderland, Jr. The stage version is solely meant for middle and high school productions and includes the majority of the film's songs and others including Song of the Souths "Zip-a-Dee-Doo-Dah", two new reprises of "I'm Late!", and three new numbers entitled "Ocean of Tears", "Simon Says", and "Who Are You?" respectively. This 60–80 minute version is licensed by Music Theatre International in the Broadway, Jr. Collection along with other Disney Theatrical shows such as Disney's Aladdin, Jr., Disney's Mulan, Jr., Beauty and the Beast, Disney's High School Musical: On Stage!, Elton John and Tim Rice's Aida, and many more.

References in other Disney films 
 In Donald in Mathmagic Land, Donald Duck wears Alice's dress and has her hairstyle, except it’s brown and not blond. A larger pencil bird is in the film as well.
 Bill the Lizard appears as one of Professor Ratigan's henchmen in The Great Mouse Detective.
 Alice and several other characters from the film were featured as guests in House of Mouse, and the Queen of Hearts was one of the villains featured in Mickey's House of Villains. The Mad Hatter was also featured in Mickey's Magical Christmas: Snowed in at the House of Mouse.
 The Mad Hatter and the March Hare were also featured in several episodes of Bonkers.
 Bill the Lizard, Tweedledum, Cheshire Cat and the doorknob also appear in the 1988 Disney film Who Framed Roger Rabbit.
 In the opening of Aladdin, the peddler tries to sell a hookah much like the one the Caterpillar used.
 In Aladdin and the King of Thieves, the Genie turns into the White Rabbit.
 Weebo shows clips of the film on her screen in Flubber.
 An episode of Mickey Mouse Clubhouse, entitled "Mickey's Adventures in Wonderland", is based on the film.
 During the song "When You Wish Upon a Star" in Disney's Pinocchio, the Alice in Wonderland book can be seen on the bookshelf where Jiminy Cricket is singing from. This reference can be considered indirect as the film was released 11 years prior to Alice in Wonderland.
 Alice and Cheshire Cat made cameo appearances in episodes of The Wonderful World of Mickey Mouse.

Spin-off 
On October 25, 2019, an undetermined animated project focused on the Cheshire Cat is being developed for Disney's subscription video on-demand streaming service, Disney+.

In 2022, a CGI-animated TV series called Alice's Wonderland Bakery was released on Disney Junior. The series centers on Alice, the great-granddaughter of the original heroine.

Theme parks 

Costumed versions of Alice, The Mad Hatter, The White Rabbit, The Queen of Hearts, Tweedledum, and Tweedledee make regular appearances at the Disney theme parks and resorts, and other characters from the film (including the Walrus and the March Hare) have featured in the theme parks, although quite rarely. Disneyland features a ride-through visit to Wonderland on board a Caterpillar-shaped ride vehicle; this adventure is unique to Disneyland and has not been reproduced at Disney's other parks.  More famously, all five Disneyland-style theme parks feature Mad Tea Party, a teacups ride based on Disney's adaptation of Alice in Wonderland.

Alice in Wonderland is also frequently featured in many parades and shows in the Disney Theme Parks, including The Main Street Electrical Parade, SpectroMagic, Fantasmic!, Dreamlights, The Move It! Shake It! Celebrate It! Street Party and Walt Disney's Parade of Dreams. Disneyland contains a dark ride based on the film in addition to the teacups, and Disneyland Paris also contains a hedge maze called Alice's Curious Labyrinth, which takes its inspiration from the film. The now-defunct Mickey Mouse Revue, shown at Walt Disney World and later at Tokyo Disneyland, contained characters and scenes from the film.

Video games 
In Disney's Villains' Revenge, the Queen of Hearts is one of the villains who tries to turn the ending to her story to where she finally cuts off Alice's head.

Mickey Mousecapade features various characters from the film. The Japanese version, in fact, is based very heavily on the film, with almost every reference in the game coming from the film.

A video game version of the film was released on Game Boy Color by Nintendo of America on October 4, 2000, in North America.

The Kingdom Hearts video game series includes Wonderland as a playable world in the titles Kingdom Hearts, Chain of Memories, 358/2 Days, Coded, and Kingdom Hearts χ. In the games, Alice is one of seven "Princesses of Heart", a group of maidens who are a major part of the plot in the series. Other characters from the film that appear in the games include the Queen of Hearts and the Card Soldiers (also enemies in the games), Cheshire Cat, White Rabbit, Doorknob, Mad Hatter, March Hare, Tweedle Dee and Tweedle Dum, and the Caterpillar (this last in the non-official Kingdom Hearts V Cast game only).

In Toy Story 3: The Video Game, the Mad Hatter's hat is one of the hats you can have the townsfolk wear. In Kinect Disneyland Adventures, Alice, Mad Hatter, White Rabbit, and the Queen of Hearts make appearances.

In Disney Infinity, there are Power Discs based on Alice in Wonderland.

Several characters of the movie make appearances throughout the Epic Mickey-games. For example, the cards are seen throughout Mickeyjunk Mountain in the original Epic Mickey, Alice appears as a statue carrying a projector screen in Epic Mickey 2 and Alice, the Mad Hatter, and the Cheshire Cat appear as unlockable characters in Epic Mickey: Power of Illusion.

Alice, White Rabbit, Mad Hatter, March Hare, Cheshire Cat, Queen of Hearts and Caterpillar appear as playable characters in Disney Magic Kingdoms, along with some attractions based on locations of the film or real attractions from Disney Parks, as content to unlock for a limited time.

Cover versions
The theme song of the same name has since become a jazz standard by the likes of Roberta Gambarini, Bill Evans and Dave Brubeck.

See also

 Alice in Wonderland (2010), a live-action film adaptation of Carroll's works and a re-imagining of the story directed by Tim Burton. A sequel to the film, Alice Through the Looking Glass, directed by James Bobin, was released in 2016.

References

Bibliography

External links 

 
 
 
 
 
 
 Alice in Wonderland on Lux Radio Theater: December 24, 1951

1951 animated films
1951 films
1950s American animated films
1950s musical fantasy films
1950s fantasy adventure films
1950s English-language films
American children's animated adventure films
American children's animated fantasy films
American children's animated musical films
American coming-of-age films
American musical fantasy films
Animated coming-of-age films
Animated films based on Alice in Wonderland
1950s children's fantasy films
Alice in Wonderland (franchise)
American fantasy adventure films
Animated films about children
Films about royalty
Films adapted into television shows
Films based on Alice in Wonderland
Films based on multiple works of a series
Films directed by Clyde Geronimi
Films directed by Hamilton Luske
Films directed by Wilfred Jackson
Films produced by Walt Disney
Films set in the Victorian era
Films set in the 1860s
Animated films set in England
Films set in castles
Films scored by Oliver Wallace
Psychedelic films
Rotoscoped films
Films about size change
Walt Disney Animation Studios films
Walt Disney Pictures animated films
1950s children's films
Films with screenplays by Winston Hibler